The Confederate States Secretary of the Navy was the head of the Confederate States Department of the Navy. Stephen R. Mallory held this position through the entire duration of the Confederate States of America.

Secretary of the Navy

See also
United States Secretary of the Navy

Government of the Confederate States of America
Confederate States Navy
1861 establishments in the Confederate States of America
Titles held only by one person